Land's End is an American crime drama series that aired in broadcast syndication from September 1995 to May 1996. A total of 22 one-hour episodes were produced. The series was created by the series' star Fred Dryer and Victor A. Schiro.

Premise
The series focuses on Mike Land (Dryer), a former LAPD cop who left the force after a case he worked on for months resulted in the acquittal of a drug lord. Mike then moved to Cabo San Lucas to work as a private investigator for his friend Willis P. Dunleevy, and to serve as director of security for the Westin Regina Resort.

Cast
 Fred Dryer as Mike Land
 Geoffrey Lewis as Willis P. Dunleevy
 Tim Thomerson as Dave 'Thunder' Thorton
 Pamela Bowen as Courtney Saunders
 William Marquez as Chief Raoul Ruiz

Production
The series was filmed on location in Cabo San Lucas. Series creator Fred Dyer and Victor A. Schiro co-wrote some of the 22 episodes.

Episodes

References

External links
 
 

1995 American television series debuts
1996 American television series endings
1990s American crime drama television series
American detective television series
English-language television shows
First-run syndicated television programs in the United States
Television series by Disney–ABC Domestic Television
Television shows set in Mexico